Kalyani Kumari Khadka (Nepali: कल्यानी कुमारी खड्का) is a Nepali communist politician and a member of the House of Representatives of the federal parliament of Nepal. She was elected under the proportional representation system from Rautahat District representing CPN UML. She is the chair of the House Development and Technology committee.

References

Living people
Place of birth missing (living people)
21st-century Nepalese women politicians
21st-century Nepalese politicians
Nepal MPs 2017–2022
Communist Party of Nepal (Unified Socialist) politicians
Communist Party of Nepal (Unified Marxist–Leninist) politicians
1964 births